Thomas Raun (born June 29, 1984) is a former Danish football midfielder. He started his career with Danish clubs Silkeborg IF and Viborg FF.

References

Living people
1984 births
Danish men's footballers
Association football midfielders
Viborg FF players
Silkeborg IF players
Landskrona BoIS players
Danish expatriate men's footballers
Expatriate footballers in Sweden
People from Vordingborg Municipality
Sportspeople from Region Zealand